Márton Braun (born 20 June 1963) is a Hungarian politician, member of the National Assembly (MP) for Szekszárd (Tolna County Constituency I) from 1998 to 2010. He became Member of Parliament from Tolna County Regional List in 2010, holding the seat until 2014. He was a member of the Committee on European Affairs from 25 June 1998 until 5 May 2014. In June 2015, Braun was appointed CEO of Szerencsejáték Ltd., the largest gaming service provider in Hungary.

Personal life
He is married to Katalin Braunné Fülöp. They have a son, Marcell, and a daughter, Anna Luca.

References

1963 births
Living people
Fidesz politicians
Members of the National Assembly of Hungary (1998–2002)
Members of the National Assembly of Hungary (2002–2006)
Members of the National Assembly of Hungary (2006–2010)
Members of the National Assembly of Hungary (2010–2014)
People from Szekszárd